Royston Crow may refer to:

Hooded crow or Royston crow, Corvus cornix
Royston Crow (newspaper), a newspaper published in Royston, Hertfordshire, England